Victoria Stambaugh (born 4 May 1993) is a Puerto Rican taekwondo practitioner. She is a two-time medalist at the Central American and Caribbean Games.

She competed in the women's 49 kg event at the 2019 Pan American Games held in Lima, Peru. In 2020, she qualified at the Pan American Olympic Qualification Tournament to compete at the 2020 Summer Olympics in Tokyo, Japan. She competed in the women's 49 kg event where she was eliminated in her first match by Avishag Semberg of Israel.

References

External links 
 

Living people
1993 births
Puerto Rican female taekwondo practitioners
Taekwondo practitioners at the 2015 Pan American Games
Taekwondo practitioners at the 2019 Pan American Games
Competitors at the 2014 Central American and Caribbean Games
Competitors at the 2018 Central American and Caribbean Games
Central American and Caribbean Games silver medalists for Puerto Rico
Central American and Caribbean Games bronze medalists for Puerto Rico
Central American and Caribbean Games medalists in taekwondo
Pan American Games competitors for Puerto Rico
Taekwondo practitioners at the 2020 Summer Olympics
Olympic taekwondo practitioners of Puerto Rico
People from Pasadena, Texas
21st-century Puerto Rican women